Alıçlı is a village in the Kozluk District of Batman Province in Turkey. The village had a population of 912 in 2021.

References 

Villages in Kozluk District